Joanne Jackson Johnson (born 1943) is a Canadian photographer.

Early life and education 
Johnson was born on October 17, 1943 in Winnipeg, Manitoba. In 1965, Johnson received a BS from the University of Manitoba. In 1972, Johnson received an MFA in Film and Photography from the University of Minnesota.

Career and photographs 
Johnson was a founding member of the Winnipeg Film Group and has served on its board since its founding in 1974. From 1974 to 1977, Johnson worked for the National Film Board of Canada and commercial companies doing freelance film work. Since 1977, Johnson has been an assistant professor of photography at the School of Art at the University of Manitoba. Johnson's photographs are held in collections at the National Gallery of Canada and Winnipeg Art Gallery.

Selected exhibitions 

 Photographs: Clayton Bailey, Joanne Jackson Johnson, David McMillan, Three-person Exhibition; Winnipeg Art Gallery; Winnipeg, Manitoba (1977)
 Joanne Jackson Johnson: Colour Photographs, Arthur Street Gallery (Plug In Inc.); Winnipeg, Manitoba (1980)
 Midstream in Mainstreet: New Photographs [Joanne Jackson Johnson], Solo Exhibition; Plug in Inc.; Winnipeg, Manitoba (1983)
 Joanne Jackson Johnson: Metaphors Metamorphs & Just Pictures, Gallery 1.1.1.; School of Art, University of Manitoba; Winnipeg, Manitoba (1984)
 Joanne Jackson Johnson [Lecture], Public Lecture; Floating Gallery; Winnipeg, Manitoba (1984)
 Arts Manitoba: Issue 12 [Joanne Jackson Johnson] is published, Border Crossings; Winnipeg, Manitoba (1984)

References

Further reading
 Robertson, Sheila (1981). Photos develop mundane themes. Star-Phoenix, P. 93.

1943 births
Living people
Artists from Winnipeg
University of Manitoba alumni
University of Minnesota College of Liberal Arts alumni
Academic staff of the University of Manitoba
Canadian women photographers